The Council of Agde was a regional synod held in September 506 at Agatha or Agde, on the Mediterranean coast east of Narbonne,  in the Septimania region of the Visigothic Kingdom, with the permission of the Visigothic King Alaric II.

The Council met under the presidency of Bishop Caesarius of Arles. It was attended by 35 bishops:

Caesarius of Arles
Cyprianus of Bordeaux
Clarus of Elusa
Tetradius of Bourges
Heraclianus of Toulouse
Sophronius of Agde
Sedatus of Nîmes
Quintianus of Rodez
Sabinus of Albi
Boëtius of Cahors
Gratianus of Aix
Nicetius of Aux
Suavis of Comminges
Galactorius of Benarnum (Lescar)
Gratus of Oloron
Vigilius of Lectoure
Maternus of Lodève
Petrus de Palatio 
Glycerius of Couserans
Chronopius of Périgueux
Probatius of Uzès
Agroecius of Antibes
Marcellus of Senez
Pentadius of Digne
[Caprario of Narbonne]‡
[Victorinus of Fréjus]‡
[Aprus of Tarbes]‡
[Euphrasius of Auvergne]‡
[Julianus of Avignon]‡
[Sextilius of Bazas]‡
[Marcellus of Apt]‡
[Pappolo]‡
[Leonicus of Châlons-sur-Saône]‡‡
Verus of Tours‡‡

‡ represented by a priest.
‡‡ represented by a deacon.

The Council of Agde promulgated 47 canons on ecclesiastical discipline. In general, its canons shed light on the moral conditions of the clergy and laity in the historical region of Septimania at the beginning of the transition from Roman social order within the Roman province of Gallia Narbonensis to that of the Visigoth migrants. They are also of some importance for the study of certain early ecclesiastical institutions.

Its canon 7, forbidding ecclesiastics to sell or alienate the property of the church from which they drew their living, seems to be the earliest indication of the later system of benefices. In Canon IX, the Council ruled that if married deacons or priests wish to return to marital relations, they should be deprived of all of their ecclesiastical dignities and offices; those, however, who were unaware of the prohibition, could be allowed to retain their office if they abstain in the future.  In Canon X, a cleric was forbidden to visit women to whom he was not related, and could have in his house only his mother, sister, daughter, or niece.  A bishop was not to ordain anyone a deacon who was not yet twenty-five years old.  In order to be ordained a priest or bishop, one had to be at least thirty years of age.  If a young married man wished to be ordained, he required the consent of his wife (Canon XVI).

Marriage between cousins was also forbidden.

References

Books

Mansi, J.-D. (ed.), Sacrorum Conciliorum nova et amplissima collectio editio novissima Tomus IX (Florence 1763).

Acknowledgment

Agde
Agde
Agde
6th century in Francia
Agde
Eastern Orthodoxy
Gallia Narbonensis